A sum-product number in a given number base  is a natural number that is equal to the product of the sum of its digits and the product of its digits. 

There are a finite number of sum-product numbers in any given base . In base 10, there are exactly four  numbers : 0, 1, 135, and 144.

Definition
Let  be a natural number.
 
where  is the number of digits in the number in base , and 
 
is the value of each digit of the number. The natural numbers 0 and 1 are trivial  numbers for all , and all other  numbers are nontrivial  numbers.

Thus, there are a finite number of  numbers, and any natural number is guaranteed to reach a periodic point or a fixed point less than  making it a preperiodic point. 

Any integer shown to be a sum-product number in a given base must, by definition, also be a Harshad number in that base.

Sum-product numbers and cycles of Fb for specific b
All numbers are represented in base .

Extension to negative integers
Sum-product numbers can be extended to the negative integers by use of a signed-digit representation to represent each integer.

Programming example
The example below implements the sum-product function described in the definition above to search for  numbers and cycles in Python.
def sum_product(x: int, b: int) -> int:
    """Sum-product number."""
    sum_x = 0
    product = 1
    while x > 0:
        if x % b > 0:
            sum_x = sum_x + x % b
            product = product * (x % b)
        x = x // b
    return sum_x * product

def sum_product_cycle(x: int, b: int) -> list[int]:
    seen = []
    while x not in seen:
        seen.append(x)
        x = sum_product(x, b)
    cycle = []
    while x not in cycle:
        cycle.append(x)
        x = sum_product(x, b)
    return cycle

See also
 Arithmetic dynamics
 Dudeney number
 Factorion
 Happy number
 Kaprekar's constant
 Kaprekar number
 Meertens number
 Narcissistic number
 Perfect digit-to-digit invariant
 Perfect digital invariant

References

Arithmetic dynamics
Base-dependent integer sequences